The 1993–94 Boise State Broncos men's basketball team represented Boise State University during the 1993–94 NCAA Division I men's basketball season. The Broncos were led by eleventh-year head coach Bobby Dye and played their home games on campus at the BSU Pavilion in Boise, Idaho.

fifth in the standings.

In the conference tournament at home in Boise, the fifth-seeded Broncos defeated Montana State by eighteen points in a quarterfinal, and top-seeded Weber State by twelve in a  In the final against second-seeded Idaho State, BSU won by four points.

For a second consecutive year, the Broncos received the automatic bid to the NCAA tournament without winning the regular season title; no other Big Sky members were invited to the tournament or  Boise State was seeded fourteenth in the West regional and lost by nine points to Louisville in the first round  It was the twelfth consecutive year that the Big Sky representative lost in the first round, a streak that ended the following year.

This was Boise State's fourth NCAA Tournament appearance in Division I, the third under Dye, and their last as a member of the Big Sky Conference.

Postseason results

|-
!colspan=6 style=| Big Sky tournament

|-
!colspan=6 style=| NCAA tournament

References

External links
Sports Reference – Boise State Broncos – 1993–94 basketball season

Boise State Broncos men's basketball seasons
Boise State
Boise State
Boise State